The Treasure of Begram or Begram Hoard is a group of artifacts from the 1st-2nd century CE discovered in the area of Begram, Afghanistan.  The French Archaeological Delegation in Afghanistan (DAFA) conducted excavations at the site between 1936 and 1940, uncovering two walled-up strongrooms, Room 10 and Room 13. Inside, a large number of bronze, alabaster, glass (remains of 180 pieces), coins, and ivory objects, along with remains of furniture and Chinese lacquer bowls, were unearthed. Some of the furniture was arranged along walls, other pieces stacked or facing each other.  In particular, a high percentage of the few survivals of Greco-Roman enamelled glass come from this discovery.

The Begram ivories are a sub-group of over a thousand decorative plaques, small figures and inlays, carved from ivory and bone, and formerly attached to wooden furniture, that were excavated in the 1930s in Bagram (Begram), Afghanistan. They are rare and important exemplars of Kushan art of the 1st or 2nd centuries CE, attesting to the cosmopolitan tastes and patronage of local dynasts, the sophistication of contemporary craftsmanship, and to the ancient trade in luxury goods.

History
The ancient city of Kapisa (near modern Bagram), in Bactria  was the summer capital of the Kushan Empire, which stretched from northern Afghanistan to northwest India between the 1st and the 4th centuries. Some eighty miles from Kabul, the strategically located city dominated two passes through the Hindu Kush, connecting Bactria with Gandhara (modern north-east Pakistan.

The finds were divided, in accordance with the system of partage, between the Musée Guimet and the National Museum of Afghanistan in Kabul. After the Kabul Museum closed in 1978 the whereabouts of the ivories was uncertain, and many items were looted in the 1990s.

A number of the missing items were located in 2004, and a further group of twenty pieces, illicitly traded by antiquities dealers, was later recovered and is to be repatriated. After conservation treatment in the British Museum they were exhibited there in 2011.

Major artifacts

Glass

Ivory

Plaster

Other materials

See also
Greco-Buddhist Art
Culture of Afghanistan

References

Further reading
Mehendale, Sanjyot, "Begram: along ancient Central Asian and Indian trade routes", Cahiers d’Asie Centrale, 1/2 1996, p. 47-64, online
Whitehouse, David, "Begram: The Glass", Topoi' Orient-Occident, 2001 11–1, pp. 437–449, online

External links

 Begram Ivory and Bone Carvings (Electronic Cultural Atlas Initiative)

Afghan culture
Ivory works of art
Indian sculpture
Archaeological discoveries in Afghanistan
History of Parwan Province
Kushan Empire